Apollonia was an ancient town on one of the islands of the Echinades in ancient Acarnania.

Its site is unlocated.

References

Populated places in ancient Acarnania
Populated places in ancient Ionian Islands
Former populated places in Greece
Lost ancient cities and towns